The American Association of Woodturners (AAW) is the principal organization in the United States supporting the art and craft of woodturning. It is sometimes stylized as American Association of Wood Turners (AAW). Established in 1986 and headquartered in Saint Paul, Minnesota, the organization encompasses more than 15,000 members in the United States and many foreign nations. As of 2013, the AAW was affiliated with nearly 350 local chapters worldwide. In addition to sponsoring an annual national symposium, the AAW provides support to local clubs for outreach and education. The 25th anniversary of the AAW was celebrated in 2011 at the annual symposium held in Saint Paul. Phil McDonald is executive director of the organization.

Mission and background
The AAW states: "Our purpose is to foster a wider understanding and appreciation of lathe-turning as a traditional and contemporary craft and a form of art among the general public and amateur, part-time, and professional woodturners. This will be accomplished by providing education, information, organization, technical assistance, and publications related to woodturning."

Woodturning, which has experienced exceptional growth and interest since AAW's founding, is a pursuit that goes back 4,000 years in human history – using craft's most organic material, wood, as its primary medium. Woodturners create utilitarian, artistic, and sculptural wooden objects on mechanical lathes. The craft differs from most other forms of woodworking in that the wood stock rotates rapidly while sharpened cutting skews, gouges, and other tools are maneuvered by hand to shape the material.

Membership in AAW brings a variety of benefits, including a bimonthly magazine, insurance coverage, scholarships, national symposiums, educational opportunities for newcomers and youth, and a website where turners can display and market their woodturnings.

The AAW was founded at the Arrowmont School of Arts and Crafts  in Gatlinburg, Tennessee, and remains closely affiliated with that institution, as well as with the John C. Campbell Folk School  in Brasstown, North Carolina, and the Anderson Ranch  in Snowmass Village, Colorado.

Organization
The AAW, a 501(c)(3) tax-exempt organization, is administered by a nine-member Board of Directors, all volunteers who serve three-year terms. Three board members are elected by the full membership each year and begin their terms in January. The Board employs an executive director and an editor, and appoints a Board of Advisors along with various committee members serving specific purposes, such as organizing the national symposium and overseeing AAW financial grants to clubs and individuals.

American Woodturner Journal
The AAW magazine, American Woodturner, is published in print and online editions six times a year. Subscriptions to the journal are included with AAW membership, and individual copies are available on newsstands. Members may view all issues online. The publication contains articles aimed at both novice woodturners as well as intermediate craftspersons and professionals.

Chapters
The AAW is affiliated with more than 350 local chapters, or clubs, and three "virtual" chapters. Local chapters are primarily in the United States but encompass groups in many other nations, including Canada, England, New Zealand, Taiwan, Australia and Japan. Virtual chapters are not geographically based but are organized around specific woodturning techniques. The three virtual chapters include the Ornamental Turners International, Segmented Woodturners, and Pen Turners www.principallypens.com. Ornamental woodturners specialize in the use of an ornamental lathe such as the Rose engine lathe. Segmented woodturning involves joining individual pieces of wood together prior to turning to create intricate patterns and dramatic visual effects. Pen turners specialize in making pens and other writing instruments out of both wood and synthetic materials.

Symposium
Each year an annual Symposium take place. They have been sponsored and organized by the AAW each year since 1987, alternating in cities around the United States. The first symposium was held in Lexington, Kentucky in 1987. The gathering typically includes live presentations, an auction of selected woodturnings, an instant gallery that showcases current woodturning craft, a rotation of how-to and hands-on demonstrations, the world's largest trade show of commercial woodturning vendors, and a youth training center.

AAW Gallery of Wood Art

The AAW operates the AAW Gallery of Wood Art www.galleryofwoodart.org in Saint Paul's historic Landmark Center. The gallery features changing exhibits of art of all kinds made from wood, and there also is a gift shop. Admission is free to the gallery, which is open daily except Monday and Saturday.
The AAW works in partnership with Collectors of Wood Art  to promote the development and appreciation of studio wood art among collectors, artists, educators, art critics, galleries, museums, and the general public.

References

External links
 American Association of Woodturners - official site

1986 establishments in the United States
Business magazines published in the United States
Art museums and galleries in Minnesota
Contemporary crafts museums in the United States
Magazines established in 1986
Non-profit organizations based in Minnesota
Organizations based in Saint Paul, Minnesota
Woodturning
Woodworking
Woodworking magazines
Tourist attractions in Saint Paul, Minnesota
Magazines published in Minnesota